Caroline Néron (born July 21, 1973) is a Canadian actress, singer and fashion designer (accessories). She has appeared in a number of roles on television and also on films. She was born in Boucherville, Quebec.

Filmography
She was nominated for "Best Performance by an Actress in a Continuing Leading Dramatic Role" prize in the 2000 Gemini Awards for her role in Cover Me.

Television
 1995: Scoop IV (TV series)
 1995: Zoya: les chemins du destin (TV)
 1996: Urgence TV series
 1997: Diva TV series
 1998: Une voix en or
 1998: Réseaux (TV series)
 1999: Cover Me
 2000: Haute surveillance(TV series)
 2001: Tribu.com (TV series)
 2019: District-31 (TV series)

Cinema
 1992: Coyote in role of Jacynthe
 1996: Love Me, Love Me Not (J'aime, j'aime pas)
 1997: Strip Search in lead role
 1997: La Conciergerie
 1998: The Invitation (L'Invitation) in role of Mireille
 2000: Un petit vent de panique
 2002: Ice Cold in lead role
 2003: Seducing Doctor Lewis (La Grande séduction) as voice of Brigitte
 2004: Eternal in role of Elizabeth Kane
 2004: C'est pas moi, c'est l'autre
 2007: Days of Darkness (L'Âge des ténèbres) in role of Carole Bigras-Bourque
 2009: Rise of the Gargoyles in role of Nicole
 2009: 3 Seasons (3 Saisons) in role of Sacha
 2020: Goddess of the Fireflies (La déesse des mouches à feu)

Discography

Albums
2003: Caroline Néron
2007: Reprogrammé
2010: Le Destin

Singles / Videos
 "Qu'est ce que t'attend?"
 "C'est juste d'lamour"
 "C'est pas la première fois"
 "On en pleure"
 "Colle-toi à moi"
 "Soul Sister"
 "Nos âmes s'appellent"
 "Contre celui que j'aime"

References

External links
 Official website
 

1973 births
Living people
People from Boucherville
French Quebecers
Canadian film actresses
Canadian television actresses
Singers from Quebec
French-language singers of Canada
Canadian women pop singers
21st-century Canadian women singers
20th-century Canadian actresses
21st-century Canadian actresses
Actresses from Quebec
Best Supporting Actress Jutra and Iris Award winners